Coleophora glareolella is a moth of the family Coleophoridae. It is found in Afghanistan.

The wingspan is about 16 mm. The forewings are uniform white with several brown scales at the apex. The hindwings are brownish-grey.

References

glareolella
Moths described in 1989
Moths of Asia